Freilichtbühne Herdringen  is a theatre in Herdringen, North Rhine-Westphalia, Germany.

Theatres in North Rhine-Westphalia